The 2013 UEFA Women's Under-17 Championship was the sixth edition of the UEFA Women's Under-17 Championship. The first matches were played on 3 September 2012.

With the return of Slovakia, who haven't played since the inaugural edition, and U-17 newcomers Montenegro, a new record of 44 participating nations was set. The final tournament was played for the last time in Nyon with four teams. Starting the next edition of the tournament, eight countries will contest the final tournament with the host changing every edition.

Dutch player Vivianne Miedema set a competition record by netting eight goals in a match against Kazakhstan. She also became the tournament's all-time top scorer with 20 goals.

For the first time Belgium and Poland qualified for the final tournament, and also for the first time Germany failed to do so.

Qualification

All 44 teams entered the first qualification round, consisting of 11 groups of 4 teams. The group winners and five best runners-up advanced to the second qualification round. In the second round, there were four groups of four teams and only the group winners advanced to the final tournament.
For the first time Poland and Belgium reached the final tournament.

Final round

The four group champions played the knockout stage in the Centre sportif de Colovray Nyon, Nyon, Switzerland in summer 2013. There will be two semifinals, a third place match and the final.

Semifinals

Third place match

Final

References

External links
UEFA.com
Tournament Regulations
2013 tournament  on soccerway.com

 
2013
women
2013
2013 in women's association football
2012–13 in Swiss football
2012–13 in Polish football
2013 in Swedish women's football
2012–13 in Belgian football
June 2013 sports events in Europe
2013 in youth association football